Jonathan Núñez may also refer to:

Jonathan Núñez (Chilean footballer) (born 1986), a Chilean footballer
Jonathan Núñez (Honduran footballer) (born 2001), a Honduran footballer